Montana is the forty-sixth richest state in the United States of America, with a per capita income of $17,151 (2000).

Montana counties ranked by per capita income

Note: Data is from the 2010 United States Census Data and the 2006-2010 American Community Survey 5-Year Estimates.

Montana places ranked by per capita income
 Cooke City-Silver Gate, Montana – $31,618
 Big Sky, Montana – $31,492
 Rollins, Montana – $27,255
 Jette, Montana – $25,808
 West Havre, Montana – $24,823
 Opheim, Montana – $24,680
 Whitefish, Montana – $23,098
 Joplin, Montana – $22,014
 Saddle Butte, Montana – $22,768
 Clancy, Montana – $22,492
 Kings Point, Montana – $22,827
 Jefferson City, Montana – $21,953
 Montana City, Montana – $21,774
 Wye, Montana – $21,553
 Frenchtown, Montana – $21,225
 Absarokee, Montana – $20,677
 Colstrip, Montana – $20,336
 Bigfork, Montana – $20,314
 Helena Valley Northeast, Montana – $20,283
 Neihart, Montana – $20,266
 Helena, Montana – $20,020
 Finley Point, Montana – $19,575
 Beaver Creek, Montana – $19,566
 Westby, Montana – $19,438
 Carter, Montana – $19,397
 Billings, Montana – $19,207
 Virginia City, Montana – $19,182
 West Yellowstone, Montana – $19,136
 Red Lodge, Montana – $19,090
 Helena Valley West Central, Montana – $18,920
 Winston, Montana – $18,846
 Seeley Lake, Montana – $18,825
 Coram, Montana – $18,799
 Flaxville, Montana – $18,567
 Lakeside, Montana – $18,533
 Custer, Montana – $18,532
 Dayton, Montana – $18,501
 Lolo, Montana – $18,369
 Helena West Side, Montana – $18,299
 Black Eagle, Montana – $18,269
 Four Corners, Montana – $18,185
 Wisdom, Montana – $18,172
 Wibaux, Montana – $18,105
 Great Falls, Montana – $18,059
 Forsyth, Montana – $17,994
 Fort Peck, Montana – $17,943
 Helena Valley Northwest, Montana – $17,910
 Orchard Homes, Montana – $17,885
 Gardiner, Montana – $17,810
 Columbus, Montana – $17,689
 Gildford, Montana – $17,648
 Florence, Montana – $17,626
 Victor, Montana – $17,599
 Rocky Point, Montana – $17,576
 Big Timber, Montana – $17,569
 Baker, Montana – $17,461
 Jordan, Montana – $17,426
 Fort Shaw, Montana – $17,381
 East Glacier Park Village, Montana – $17,318
 Ennis, Montana – $17,310
 Missoula, Montana – $17,166
 Scobey, Montana – $17,150
 Butte-Silver Bow (balance), Montana – $17,068
 Bridger, Montana – $17,060
 Manhattan, Montana – $17,024
 Laurel, Montana – $16,953
 Park City, Montana – $16,912
 Sidney, Montana – $16,911
 Rudyard, Montana – $16,889
 Lewistown, Montana – $16,817
 Amsterdam-Churchill, Montana – $16,767
 Ballantine, Montana – $16,707
 Livingston, Montana – $16,636
 Big Arm, Montana – $16,620
 Power, Montana – $16,527
 Hingham, Montana – $16,525
 Kicking Horse, Montana – $16,524
 Elliston, Montana – $16,501
 Miles City, Montana – $16,449
 Dillon, Montana – $16,432
 Saco, Montana – $16,421
 Malta, Montana – $16,405
 Medicine Lake, Montana – $16,405
 Reed Point, Montana – $16,389
 St. Marie, Montana – $16,314
 Alder, Montana – $16,300
 Glasgow, Montana – $16,246
 Kalispell, Montana – $16,224
 Lonepine, Montana – $16,218
 Bozeman, Montana – $16,104
 West Glendive, Montana – $16,100
 Chester, Montana – $16,077
 Chinook, Montana – $16,038
 Cut Bank, Montana – $15,977
 Broadus, Montana – $15,938
 Trout Creek, Montana – $15,910
 East Helena, Montana – $15,893
 Havre, Montana – $15,847
 Woods Bay, Montana – $15,792
 Hysham, Montana – $15,743
 Conrad, Montana – $15,742
 Sun Prairie, Montana – $15,685
 Bonner-West Riverside, Montana – $15,652
 Clyde Park, Montana – $15,646
 Plentywood, Montana – $15,609
 Inverness, Montana – $15,594
 Anaconda-Deer Lodge County, Montana – $15,580
 Glendive, Montana – $15,544
 Whitehall, Montana – $15,527
 Klein, Montana – $15,522
 Evaro, Montana – $15,465
 Nashua, Montana – $15,452
 Geraldine, Montana – $15,403
 Culbertson, Montana – $15,393
 Sheridan, Montana – $15,369
 Three Forks, Montana – $15,362
 Belgrade, Montana – $15,266
 Fairfield, Montana – $15,255
 Stanford, Montana – $15,253
 Sunburst, Montana – $15,244
 Roundup, Montana – $15,123
 Terry, Montana – $15,093
 Shelby, Montana – $15,071
 Melstone, Montana – $15,027
 Froid, Montana – $15,021
 Ovando, Montana – $15,012
 Hobson, Montana – $15,002
 Choteau, Montana – $14,999
 Bainville, Montana – $14,997
 Denton, Montana – $14,982
 Belt, Montana – $14,970
 Philipsburg, Montana – $14,951
 Deer Lodge, Montana – $14,883
 Valier, Montana – $14,862
 Fort Benton, Montana – $14,861
 Big Sandy, Montana – $14,801
 Radersburg, Montana – $14,733
 Heron, Montana – $14,725
 Stevensville, Montana – $14,700
 Hamilton, Montana – $14,689
 Richey, Montana – $14,684
 Pablo, Montana – $14,672
 Fromberg, Montana – $14,667
 Boulder, Montana – $14,657
 Sun River, Montana – $14,647
 Dutton, Montana – $14,638
 Augusta, Montana – $14,608
 Ulm, Montana – $14,602
 Wilsall, Montana – $14,585
 Lockwood, Montana – $14,579
 Highwood, Montana – $14,457
 Lambert, Montana (Fox Lake CDP) – $14,443
 Plevna, Montana – $14,360
 Columbia Falls, Montana – $14,355
 Noxon, Montana – $14,350
 Helena Valley Southeast, Montana – $14,349
 Worden, Montana – $14,319
 Evergreen, Montana – $14,277
 Lincoln, Montana – $14,243
 Cascade, Montana – $14,219
 Drummond, Montana – $14,213
 Walkerville, Montana – $14,156
 Superior, Montana – $14,154
 St. Regis, Montana – $14,137
 Ravalli, Montana – $14,094
 Kevin, Montana – $14,003
 Huntley, Montana – $13,913
 White Sulphur Springs, Montana – $13,836
 Somers, Montana – $13,786
 Polson, Montana – $13,777
 Reserve, Montana – $13,742
 Harlowton, Montana – $13,717
 Townsend, Montana – $13,674
 Riverbend, Montana – $13,672
 Ekalaka, Montana – $13,667
 Wolf Point, Montana – $13,605
 Vaughn, Montana – $13,600
 Bearcreek, Montana – $13,572
 Circle, Montana – $13,412
 East Missoula, Montana – $13,333
 Harlem, Montana – $13,295
 Harrison, Montana – $13,287
 Joliet, Montana – $13,254
 Willow Creek, Montana – $13,251
 Thompson Falls, Montana – $13,245
 Fairview, Montana – $13,235
 Belfry, Montana – $13,186
 Twin Bridges, Montana – $13,171
 Lima, Montana – $13,163
 Fortine, Montana – $13,140
 Moore, Montana – $13,140
 Alberton, Montana – $13,120
 Libby, Montana – $13,090
 Outlook, Montana – $13,066
 Hardin, Montana – $13,041
 Shepherd, Montana – $13,025
 Plains, Montana – $13,010
 Agency, Montana – $12,990
 Martin City, Montana – $12,896
 Loma, Montana – $12,885
 Broadview, Montana – $12,882
 De Borgia, Montana – $12,791
 Avon, Montana – $12,777
 Hot Springs, Montana – $12,690
 Garrison, Montana – $12,678
 Eureka, Montana – $12,619
 Winifred, Montana – $12,600
 Kremlin, Montana – $12,598
 Clinton, Montana – $12,510
 Lavina, Montana – $12,475
 Rexford, Montana – $12,355
 St. Ignatius, Montana – $12,336
 Greycliff, Montana – $12,023
 Ryegate, Montana – $12,016
 Toston, Montana – $11,945
 Basin, Montana – $11,878
 Knife River, Montana – $11,865
 Herron, Montana – $11,779
 Camp Three, Montana – $11,767
 Simms, Montana – $11,758
 Ronan, Montana – $11,678
 Darby, Montana – $11,658
 St. Xavier, Montana – $11,578
 Arlee, Montana – $11,558
 Malmstrom AFB, Montana – $11,450
 Niarada, Montana – $11,388
 Dixon, Montana – $11,379
 Lewistown Heights, Montana – $11,274
 Grass Range, Montana – $10,939
 Havre North, Montana – $10,921
 Winnett, Montana – $10,892
 Fort Smith, Montana – $10,692
 Charlo, Montana – $10,687
 Troy, Montana – $10,620
 Poplar, Montana – $10,579
 Hungry Horse, Montana – $10,530
 Dodson, Montana – $10,187
 Corvallis, Montana – $10,167
 Ismay, Montana – $9,852
 Turtle Lake, Montana – $9,838
 Cardwell, Montana – $9,716
 Fallon, Montana – $9,701
 Ashland, Montana – $9,577
 St. Pierre, Montana – $9,437
 Paradise, Montana – $9,405
 Birney, Montana – $9,338
 Fort Belknap Agency, Montana – $9,053
 Browning, Montana – $8,955
 Judith Gap, Montana – $8,927
 North Browning, Montana – $8,572
 Musselshell, Montana – $8,501
 Busby, Montana – $8,383
 Brockton, Montana – $8,231
 Lodge Grass, Montana – $8,130
 Starr School, Montana – $8,105
 Wyola, Montana – $7,815
 Pryor, Montana – $7,640
 Old Agency, Montana – $7,623
 Parker School, Montana – $7,453
 Crow Agency, Montana – $7,354
 Lame Deer, Montana – $7,247
 Heart Butte, Montana – $6,845
 Sangrey, Montana – $6,519
 Hays, Montana – $6,489
 Frazer, Montana – $6,435
 Lodge Pole, Montana – $6,276
 Box Elder, Montana – $6,128
 South Browning, Montana – $5,666
 Antelope, Montana – $5,455
 Azure, Montana – $5,407
 Boneau, Montana – $5,200
 Pinesdale, Montana – $5,051
 Muddy, Montana – $4,837
 Elmo, Montana – $2,778
 Kerr, Montana – $0

References

United States locations by per capita income
Economy of Montana
Income